ʿAbd Allāh ibn ʿUmar ibn al-Khaṭṭāb, commonly known as Ibn Umar, was a companion of the Islamic prophet Muhammad and a son of the second Caliph Umar. He was a prominent authority in hadith and law. He remained neutral during the events of the first Fitna (656–661).

Muhammad's era — 610 to 632
Abd Allah ibn Umar (kunya Abu Abd al-Rahman ) was born in 610 in Mecca, three years after the beginning of Muhammad's message. He was the son of Umar ibn al-Khattab and Zaynab bint Maz'un. His full siblings were Hafsa and Abd al-Rahman. His paternal brothers, born to his stepmother Umm Kulthum bint Jarwal, were Zayd and Ubayd Allah. He had another stepmother, Qurayba bint Abi Umayya, but she had no children of her own.

It was said that the young Abd Allah had vivid memories of his father's conversion to Islam. It is believed he accepted Islam together with his father, although some sources disagree about the year of his acceptance. He remembered following his father around the town as Umar declared his conversion to the neighbours and on the steps of the Kaaba. Abd Allah asserted, "Although I was very young at the time, I understood everything I saw." His mother Zaynab also became a Muslim, but his two stepmothers did not.

His family emigrated to Medina in 622, although he may have emigrated to Medina before his father. Before the Battle of Uhud in March 625, Muhammad called Abd Allah Ibn Umar, who was then fourteen years old, to present himself. But when Abd Allah appeared, Muhammad would not allow him to fight in the battle. Two years later, as the Battle of the Trench approached, Muhammad again called Abd Allah, and this time he decreed that he was old enough because he was mature and reached puberty. He was also present at the Battle of Al-Muraysi in 628.

He was enlisted in the last army prepared by Muhammad for the expedition of Usama bin Zayd.

Family

After his father became Caliph in 634, Abd Allah Ibn Umar married Safiya bint Abu Ubayd, and they had six children: Abu Bakr, Abu Ubayda, Waqid, Umar, Hafsa and Sawda.

Abd Allah Ibn Umar's sister Hafsa married Muhammad in 625. Muhammad once told her: "Abd Allah is a good man. I wish he prayed the night prayers." After that, it was said that every night Abd Allah would pray much and sleep but a little.

Political interests

During his caliphate, Umar created a council and took his son Abd Allah as his advisor, but did not permit him to introduce himself as a caliphate candidate after his father.

At the Arbitration of Siffin, some sources report that Abu Musa al-Ash'ari nominated Abd Allah Ibn Umar for the caliphate, but Amr ibn al-As objected.

Ibn Umar participated in battles in Iraq, Persia and Egypt, but he remained neutral throughout the first Fitna. In 656, he prevented his sister Hafsa from following Aisha to the Battle of the Camel.

While in Medina during the Second Fitna of the 680s, Abd Allah Ibn Umar, together with Abd Allah ibn al-Zubayr and Abd Allah ibn Abbas, advised Husayn ibn Ali to remain at Mecca. Husayn did not take this advice but chose to go to Kufa.

Death
Abd Allah ibn Umar died in Mecca in 693 (74 AH).

Legacy
Abd Allah ibn Umar was the second most prolific narrator of ahadith, with a total of 2,630 narrations. It was said that he was extremely careful about what he narrated and that he narrated with his eyes full of tears. He was very cautious in life and thus was also cautious in his judgement.

See also
 Companions of the Prophet
 List of Sahabah

References

Umar
Sahabah hadith narrators
610 births
693 deaths
7th-century Arabs
Children of Rashidun caliphs
Banu Adi